Josep Sánchez i Llibre (Vilassar de Mar, Spain 6 May 1949) is a Spanish politician from the Democratic Union of Catalonia. He has represented Barcelona Province in the Spanish Congress of Deputies since 1996 and was also a member of the Parliament of Catalonia and Senate of Spain.

Members of the Senate of Spain
Members of the 6th Congress of Deputies (Spain)
Members of the 7th Congress of Deputies (Spain)
Members of the 8th Congress of Deputies (Spain)
Members of the 9th Congress of Deputies (Spain)
Members of the 10th Congress of Deputies (Spain)
Members of the Parliament of Catalonia
People from Vilassar de Mar
Democratic Union of Catalonia politicians